Vaya Con Dios (Spanish for "Go with God!") is a Belgian music act that stood out for its mixing of styles, as well as the distinctive voice of its lead singer Dani Klein. It was one of the most successful Belgian music acts ever, having sold more than 10 million albums  and more than 3 million singles.

It was founded in 1986, but after 1991 Vaya Con Dios was for the most part a one woman band, centered on singer, lyricist, band leader and producer Dani Klein, reinforced by an ever-changing selection of musicians. In 2014, Dani Klein performed her last international tour under the Vaya Con Dios formula. Vaya Con Dios officially disbanded with their last concert on 25 October 2014, in Forest National. In 2022 Vaya Con Dios returned with a new album.

Biography
Vaya Con Dios was founded in 1986 by Dirk Schoufs, Dani Klein (Danielle Schoovaerts) and Willy Lambregt (known as Willy Willy). Schoufs (1962; double bass) and Lambregt (1959; guitars) were close friends, who had frequently worked as an acoustic duo. Klein (1953; lead singer, lyricist) and Lambregt had previously worked in electronic band Arbeid Adelt !, which lost momentum when band leader Marcel Vanthilt left to become an MTV Europe VJ.

After enjoying a one-off performance as a trio, they decided to form Vaya Con Dios, based on shared interests in gypsy music, jazz and opera – genres they felt were underappreciated in Brussels.

The trio's first single "Just a Friend of Mine" (1987) entered the top 20 in Belgium, and became a top 10 hit in France. This was a milestone especially for Klein, who was now 34, and who had been trying to make it as a singer since age 17.
After this first hit, Lambregt left the band, well before the 1988 debut album Vaya Con Dios was completed, and was later replaced by Jean-Michel Gielen. This first album, self-produced by Schoufs and Klein, met with mixed critical acclaim, mostly because it was very eclectic, and difficult to categorize. Nevertheless, it was well received in several European countries, and held three more singles.

The 1990 follow-up album "Night Owls" was again produced by Klein and Schoufs, and produced another three singles. "Nah Neh Nah", an up-tempo mix of Latin and jazz-rock, profited from heavy airplay on MTV Europe. "What's a Woman?", a soul ballad, did well across Europe, and became a number one hit in the Netherlands and Belgium.

In 1991, Schoufs and Klein fell out badly, resulting in Schoufs' departure from the band, only to die months later, on 24 May 1991, at the age of just 29, of a cocktail of medication, alcohol, and drugs.

Klein, left playing with just Gielen and various musicians, nevertheless continued to record a new Vaya Con Dios album, while at the same time doing more and more international performances, due to ever-increasing popularity. In 1992, Time Flies was released, produced mostly by Klein herself. Again three singles were released from the album, the dramatic "Heading For a Fall" doing well in several countries. The album did very well in Europe, reaching number one in Switzerland and getting platinum certification in four countries, eventually proving to be the most successful Vaya Con Dios album. In 1993 it was followed with the first Vaya Con Dios world tour.

In 1995 Klein, by then evidently suffering from a high workload, still managed to record a fourth Vaya Con Dios album: Roots and Wings, from which yet another three singles were released. Recorded at Muscle Shoals Sound Studio in Alabama, the album is even more soul oriented, while at the same time integrating Arab and India music influences. Again there was album chart success in several European countries.

In 1996 Klein quit the music business because of complete fatigue, marked by spontaneous hair loss. She returned in 1999 as the singer in the group Purple Prose, which released a debut album that year. Vaya Con Dios returned in 2004 with a new album titled The Promise.

In 2006, The Ultimate Collection greatest hits album was released. It featured Aaron Neville on a new recording of the 1990 soul ballad "What's a Woman?" In October 2009, the album Comme on est venu was released, for the first time with all songs in French (one of Klein's first languages). In December 2010, the German DJ Duo Milk & Sugar released a remix of the song "Nah Neh Nah" that reached the Top 10 in the German Media-Control Charts.

In 2013, Dani Klein started a farewell tour, the last Vaya Con Dios tour ever. The last concert was held 25 October 2014 at Forest National in Brussels, but in 2022, after 8 years, the band returned with a new album 'What's a Woman'.

Discography

Albums

Studio albums

Compilation albums

Singles

Notes and References

Note
Literally "May God go with you", "Godspeed".

References

External links
Vaya Con Dios' website
Vaya Con Dios and Purple Prose at the Belgian Pop & Rock Archives
Vaya Con Dios and Dani Klein Forums

Belgian pop music groups
Musical groups established in 1986
Musical groups disestablished in 1996
Musical groups established in 2004
Musical groups disestablished in 2014
Ariola Records artists